R-20 regional road is a Montenegrin roadway.

History

Before building of Šavnik-Žabljak section of M-6 highway, this road was main connection between these two cities.

In January 2016, the Ministry of Transport and Maritime Affairs published bylaw on categorisation of state roads. With new categorisation, R-20 regional road was created from municipal road that connected Tušina and Žabljak, and part of R-18 regional road between Tušina and Šavnik.

Major intersections

References

R-20